Orthochromis kasuluensis is a species of cichlid endemic to Tanzania where it is only known from the upper Ruchugi River drainage.  This species can reach a length of  SL.

References

External links

Fish of Tanzania
kasuluensis
Fish described in 1998
Taxa named by Lothar Seegers
Endemic fauna of Tanzania
Taxonomy articles created by Polbot